The 2019–20 Football Superleague of Kosovo season, also known as the IPKO Superleague of Kosovo for sponsorship reasons with IPKO is the 21st season of top-tier football in Kosovo. The season began on 17 August 2019 and will end on 26 July 2020. A total of 12 teams are competing in the league: ten teams from the 2018–19 season and two teams from the 2018–19 First Football League of Kosovo. Feronikeli are the defending champions from the previous season.

After UEFA permission Kosovo will be represented with 3 teams in European competitions, Superleague winner will take part in Champions League while domestic league runners-up and domestic cup winner will take part in Europa League.

The Football Federation of Kosovo has also announced that the current season will be the last season with 12 teams. 4 teams will be relegated to First Football League of Kosovo and 2 teams from First Football League of Kosovo will be promoted to Superleague of Kosovo to complete the 10 teams for the 2020–21 season.

Teams and stadiums

Liria and KEK were relegated after finishing the previous season in eleventh and twelfth-place respectively. They will be replaced by the champions and runners-up of the 2018–19 First League, Vushtrria and Dukagjini respectively.
Note: Table lists in alphabetical order.

League table

Results
Each team plays three times against every opponent (either twice at home and once away or once at home and twice away) for a total of 33 games played each.

Matches 1–22

Matches 23–33

Season statistics

Scoring

Top scorers

Notes and references

Notes

References

External links
Official website

Football Superleague of Kosovo seasons
Kosovo
1